Henry McCall (November 19, 1907 – December 5, 1998), nicknamed "Butch", was an American Negro league first baseman in the 1930s and 1940s.

A native of Ellisville, Mississippi, McCall made his Negro leagues debut in 1936 with the Chicago American Giants. He played for Chicago again in 1937, as well as for the Indianapolis ABCs. After a stint with the Birmingham Black Barons in 1938, he returned to Chicago in 1939, and played there again in 1944 and 1945. McCall died in Chicago, Illinois in 1998 at age 91.

References

External links
 and Baseball-Reference Black Baseball stats and Seamheads

1907 births
1998 deaths
Birmingham Black Barons players
Chicago American Giants players
Indianapolis ABCs players
Baseball first basemen
Baseball players from Mississippi
People from Ellisville, Mississippi
20th-century African-American sportspeople